Handleyomys saturatior, also known as the cloud forest oryzomys or cloud forest rice rat, is a species of rodent in the genus Handleyomys of family Cricetidae.
It is found in Belize, El Salvador, Guatemala, Honduras, Mexico, and Nicaragua in cloud forest at elevations from 750 to 2500 m. It was previously placed in the genus Oryzomys.

References

Literature cited
Musser, G. G. and M. D. Carleton. 2005. Superfamily Muroidea. pp. 894–1531 in Mammal Species of the World a Taxonomic and Geographic Reference. D. E. Wilson and D. M. Reeder eds. Johns Hopkins University Press, Baltimore.
 

Handleyomys
Mammals described in 1901
Taxonomy articles created by Polbot
Taxa named by Clinton Hart Merriam